The Meghwal (also known as  Megh and Meghraj) people live primarily in northwest India, with a small population in Pakistan. Their traditional occupation was agricultural farming, cattle-herding and weaving. Meghwals are known for their contribution to embroidery and the textile industry. Most are Hindu by religion, with Rishi Megh, Kabir, and Ram Devji, and Bankar Mataji their chief gods.

Synonyms
The Meghwal community is known by various names, depending on location. Examples include Balai, Menghwar, Bhambhi ,meghwar, meghwanshi, Kamad, Rikhia.

Origins
They claim to have descended from Rishi Megh, a saint who had the power to bring rain from the clouds through his prayer. The word Meghwar is derived from the Sanskrit words megh, meaning clouds and rain, and war (Hindi: वार), meaning a group, son and child. (Sanskrit: वार:)
Literally, then, the words Meghwal and  Meghwar connote a people who belong to Megh lineage.

However, it is theorized that at the time of Muslim invasion of India, many people of high castes including Rajputs, Charans, Brahmins, and Jats joined or were recruited in the Bhambhi caste. Due to this, there came 5 main divisions in the community:

 Adu or unmixed Bhambis,
 Maru Bhambis comprising Rajputs,
 Charaniya Bhambis including Charans,
 Bamnia Bhambis comprising Paliwal Brahmins
 Jata Bhambis including Jats

Some Meghwals are associated with other social groups. Shyam Lal Rawat refers to the Meghwals of Rajasthan as "one of the dominating backward castes ...", a connection also made by Debashis Debnath. The Balali and Bunkar communities have also begun using the Meghwal name. A mathematician and social worker Sahiram G. Inkhiya refer that some people who use Chamar surname for a long time but now they want to adopt Meghwal surname for dignified lifestyle.

Culture 
There exists cultural differences among these sub-caste groups of Meghwal. For example: the Meghwal like Jata Bhambis, Bamnia Bhambis and Charania Bhambis in Rajasthan do not inter marry within other sub-castes. These sub-groups being more conscious about their previous identities maintain their old customs and traditions.

Furthermore, there were also considerable diversity in dressing habits between different  sub-groups. In 1891, when Hardyal Singh wrote about the Bhambi, Meghwal  caste of Marwar states, he observed:"The first two divisions (The Adu or unmixed Bhambis and the Maru Bhambis) are very closely connected and inter-marry, while the last two divisions only marry in their own communities respectively. The Bhambis are not allowed to wear gold and silver ornaments, but an exception is made in the case of head village Bhambi and his wife. There is striking popularity in the dress of men, but the Maru Bhambi women generally wear Ghagra or petticoat of country chintz, while the Jata Bhambis dress themselves like the Jat women and are distinguished from the use of lac churas instead of ivory ones. The women of the Charnia Bhambis wear a dress of yellow colour like the Charan women."

Geographical distribution
The Meghwal are found in Gujarat, Madhya Pradesh, Maharashtra and Rajasthan. The Meghs, Kabir Panthi or Bhagat are from Himachal Pradesh and Jammu and Kashmir and are known as Megh, Arya Megh and Bhagat. In some places they are known as Ganeshia, Meghbansi, Mihagh, Rakhesar, Rakhia, Rikhia, Rishia and other names. Some of the Mahashas also claim to be belonging to Meghs. After Partition of India in 1947, the Meghs who had become converts to the Hinduism, had to migrate to Indian territory.

As of 1991, the population of Meghs in Punjab (India) was estimated at 105,157.

Meghwals of Kutch-Gujarat 
In Kutch, Meghwals are divided into 4 entities depending on their origin or their time period of arrival:

 Maheshwari,
 Charania,
 Marvada,
 Gujar

Meghwal of Madhya Pradesh 
Meghwal of Madhya Pradesh are largely concentrated in Khargone district. They are known by various names such as Ganeshia, Rikhia, and Risha. They are divided into four subdivisions, namely Maheswari or Kachhi, Charania, Gujra, and Marwada.

Lifestyle
In the countryside of Rajasthan, many of the people of this community still reside in small hamlets of round, mud-brick huts painted on the outside with colourful geometric designs and decorated with detailed mirror inlays. In earlier days the main occupation of the Meghwal community was agricultural labour, weaving, specially Khadi and woodcarving, and these are still the main occupations. The women are famous for their embroidery work and are master wool and cotton weavers.

Increasing numbers of the Meghwal today are educated and are obtaining government jobs. In Punjab, especially in the cities like Amritsar, Jalandhar and Ludhiana a good number of them is engaged as workers in factories producing sports, hosiery, surgical and metal goods. Very few of them have their own business or a small scale industry. Tiny business and service units are their main support for livelihood.

Their staple diet includes rice, wheat and maize, and pulses such as moong, urad and channa. They are vegetarian but eat egg.

Marriages are arranged through negotiation between the families before puberty. After marriage, the wife moves to the husband's house, except for the period of childbirth.

Arts

The Meghwal women in Rajasthan are renowned for their exuberantly detailed costumes and jewellery. Married women are often spotted wearing gold nose ring, earrings and neckpieces. They were given to the bride as a "bride wealth" dowry by her soon-to-be husband's mother. Nose rings and earrings are often decorated with precious stones of ruby, sapphire and emerald. The Meghwal women's embroidery is avidly sought after. Their work is distinguished by their primary use of red, which comes from a local pigment produced from crushed insects.  The Meghwal women artisans of Thar desert in Sindh and Balochistan, and in Gujarat are considered master of the traditional embroidery and Ralli making.  Exotic hand-embroidered items form part of dowry of Meghwal woman.

Notable people 

 Arjun Ram Meghwal (MP from Bikaner and Minister of State for Parliamentary Affairs & Culture )
 Govind Ram Meghwal (MLA from Khajuwala, Bikaner)
 Nihalchand Meghwal (MP from Sri Ganganagar)

See also 

 Balai
 Kolhi

References

Dalit communities
Social groups of Sindh
Social groups of India
Weaving communities of South Asia
Scheduled Castes of Chhattisgarh
Scheduled Castes of Jammu and Kashmir
Scheduled Castes of Delhi
Scheduled Castes of Rajasthan
Scheduled Castes of Uttar Pradesh
Scheduled Castes of Gujarat
Scheduled Castes of Madhya Pradesh
Social groups of Rajasthan
Embroidery in India